Syed Mustafa Kamal (born 27 December 1971) is a Pakistani Politician and former Mayor of City of Karachi. In 2002 general election he was elected as an MPA in Sindh Assembly and served as Minster of Information Technology. He was appointed as a Senator in the Senate of Pakistan in 2012 for a term of 6 years however resigned after six months due to political differences with his own party.

He was elected Nazim / Mayor of Karachi from 2005 to 2010 and won world best Mayor Award in 2010 by Foreign Policy Magazine, USA and finalist in the City Mayors’ Foundation’s World Mayor of the Year Award in 2010. .

Early life 
Syed Mustafa Kamal was born on 27 December 1971 in Karachi, Sindh, Pakistan. His parents were Anis Ahmed and Jamila Khatoon who migrated to Pakistan. He studied from University of Wales in the United Kingdom. In 1996, Kamal studied at the Sunway College.

Syed Mustafa Kamal is married and has 3 children.

Political career

Ministry of Information Technology 
In 2003, Kamal was chosen by MQM Leader Saeed Bharam, to be the IT Minister for the Sindh Province. Syed Mustafa Kamal served as the IT Minister for the Sindh province from 2003 to 2005, Afterward Mustufa Kamal was nominated Mayor of Karachi By Altaf Hussain, A landslide win which turned Mustufa kamal from an unknown telephone operator at Ninezero to Mayor of a Metropolitan city Karachi with 25 Million people.

Mayor of Karachi 

On 7 October 2005, Kamal was chosen as the mayor of Karachi by MQM the support MQM Leader Saeed Bharam for his work in the party as a telephone operator. Kamal was one of the most successful mayor of Karachi due to unchallenged Independence, resources & massive political backing of MQM Leader Saeed Bharam who provided him with thousands of workers to make Karachi Mayor-ship successful for MQM . He was named as a finalist for the World Mayor Prize in 2010.

Senator 
In 2012, he was elected to the Pakistani Senate from Sindh. In 2013, he resigned from his seat and cited personal obligations behind his resignation.

Corruption Charges, Inquiry & Differences with MQM and departure 

Kamal left Pakistan after developing differences with Khalid Maqbool Siddiqui due to corruption allegation, Many Documents from PPP Government were handed out to MQM Supremo Altaf Hussain, Which resulted in an inquiry by Khalid Maqbool Siddiqui. The Muttahida Qaumi Movement announced that Syed Mustafa Kamal submitted his resignation from Senate seat and left Pakistan due to personal and family reasons. Later in Dubai Mustafa Kamal join Malik Riaz's Behria Town and started managing Bahria Town's construction business from Dubai. In Dubai due to his difference with the party of corruption inquiry he formed PSP with Anis Qaimkhani. He after leaving the political party, joined Malik Riaz’s company Bahria Town.

Comeback and formation of Pak Sarzameen Party 
After leaving Pakistan in August 2013, he returned from Dubai to Karachi, Pakistan on March 3, 2016, accompanying Anis Kaimkhani and holding a press conference in a rented house in Karachi's posh area at Khayaban e Sahar in Defence Phase 6 Karachi on the same day at 3:00 PM.

In his famous press conference, Mustafa Kamal opened up about his lifelong personal experiences as a prominent member of Muttahida Qaumi Movement and what made him leave the country even when he was serving as a senator at the time. He discussed several controversies surrounding MQM, the leader Altaf Hussain and his behaviour towards the party members.

On 23 March 2016, In the conference, Kamal also disclosed the vision of a new party he is laying foundations of, the name of which is not decided yet. According to him, "Today we are laying the foundation of an organisation, you may call it a party. We are just two individuals, myself and Anees Kaimkhani." Kamal announced the name of party as Pak Sarzameen Party. He also revealed the flag of his party which turned out to be the Flag of Pakistan. He told that the PSP has a flag is not for public. In his support several individual have contacted and showed support and also few more members from MQM joined Mustafa Kamal's team. According to Anees Kaimkhani they will continue to welcome people. Mustafa Kamal disclosed that they will organize a public speech at Bagh-e-Jinnah near Mazar-e-Quaid Karachi. Many people of MQM left it and joined PSP.

Azeem Ahmed Tariq Murder & Mustafa Kamal 

According to sources Mustafa Kamal former Mayor of Karachi was involved in the murder of MQM Chairman Azeem Ahmad Tariq. He opened the doors for the MQM killers.

Controversies and cases

China-Cutting Case 
The Anti Corruption Establishment (ACE) registered an FIR against Kamal, Saeed bharam and 24 other PSP workers. ACE said that Kamal and 24 others were involved in illegal allotment of 82 acres of amenity land in Mehmoodabad in 2009. The inquiry of ACE was revealed in November 2017 which told that Kamal allotted state land by embezzling his powers. The ACE then questioned Kamal and then Kamal stated that he had allotted in good intentions around 49 acres to the affectees of Lines Area project and the present government could cancel the allotment. Kamal made it clear he had no links with the China-Cutting Case and he was not responsible for what happened in the case.

Illegal Allotment Case 
National Accountability Bureau (NAB) filed a reference against Mustafa Kamal pertaining to the alleged illegal allotment of state-owned lands in Clifton, Block 3, near Sea View. According to the NAB's references, The land was allotted to hawkers and shopkeepers in 1980 which was later got by DG Builders on lease in 2005.

Electoral history

General elections 2002 

Syed Mustafa Kamal contested for the Provincial Assembly of Sindh seat PS-117. Kamal got 37,671 votes and won his seat in the Provincial Assembly of Sindh.

General elections 2018 

Kamal contested the 2018 Pakistan General Election for National Assembly and two Provincial Assemblies however; he failed to make it despite his claim to win the seat. People thought that PSP had ended but Kamal didn't give up hope and he still made a speech after elections saying PSP hasn't ended. Later on in an interview Kamal told the process of the elections and how they were not fair.

References

External links

Syed Mustafa Kamal Biography
City district govt official website
CityMayors profile
Khaleej Times - Dubai News, UAE News, Gulf, News, Latest news, Arab news, Gulf News, Dubai Labour News
Mustafa Kamal declared second best world mayor
Syed Mustafa Kamal Profile - Member Sindh Assembly 2002-07
Mustafa Kamal 
Mustafa Kamal Return 
Facts Behind Mustafa Kamal's Party

Pak Sarzameen Party members
1971 births
Living people
Mayors of places in Pakistan
Mayors of Karachi
Politics of Karachi
Alumni of the University of Wales
Politicians from Karachi
Pakistani people of Bihari descent
Pakistani political party founders
Pakistani senators (14th Parliament)